Ferrisia virgata, commonly known as the striped mealybug, is a species of mealybug belonging to the Pseudococcidae family. F. virgata parasitizes different crops including cottonplants. The species was discovered and described by Theodore Dru Alison Cockerell in 1893.

Images

References 

Pseudococcidae
Agricultural pest insects